The A1500 is an 'A' road entirely within the English county of Lincolnshire. It links the A156 at Marton with the A15 south of RAF Scampton via Sturton by Stow.

The A1500 follows the Roman road Till Bridge Lane and at the very end at Scampton, Horncastle Lane. This Roman Road was part of the Alternative route from Lincoln to York used when the Humber was impassable, and is thus associated with Ermine Street in the Antonine Itinerary.

Route
The junction in the Village is actually a crossroads: The Roman alignment is maintained toward the west, crosses the River Trent to Littleborough, Nottinghamshire, and can be intermittently discovered nearly to Bawtry. (None of this is part of the A1500.)

The whole length along the Roman Road is known as Till Bridge Lane.  The section from the deviation at SK947784 to the roundabout on the A15 is named Horncastle Lane.  The name Horncastle Lane continues on the other side of the A15, but that is a minor road not part of the A1500 designation.

The A1500 is single carriageway throughout.

This is the main entrance to the Lincolnshire Showground, which is based around the Roman Road.

See also
List of A roads in Zone 1 of the Great Britain numbering scheme
Ermine Street

References

* 
 – references to the Roman Road, at Manton, Stourton,

External links

 – description of Roman town on the banks of the Trent, where the Roman Road crossed.

Roads in England